William M. Hart-Bennett  (1861–1918) was a British government official who served overseas. He was a British colonial minister in Nassau, Bahamas and a governor of British Honduras (now known as Belize) from 29 January 1918 to 4 September 1918, and before that was employed as Colonial Secretary of the Bahamas.

Hart-Bennett was married on 27 April 1899 to Ella Mary Tuck, the daughter of Charles E. Tuck and his second wife Emily Mary Tuck of Norwich, England. Ella was an author and a prominent figure in Nassau's society. She was president of the Nassau Dumb Friends League and a member of the Imperial Order of the Daughters of the Empire. She is best remembered as the author of the book An English Girl In Japan (1906). Ella died at the age of 49 in the sinking of the RMS Empress of Ireland on 29 May 1914. Bennett himself died on 4 September 1918 from injuries sustained in a fire on 17 August 1918, when a flagpole at the courthouse fell on him. A new building (which now serves the Supreme Court) was completed in 1926, and its clock tower memorializes him.

References

Colonial Administrative Service officers
Governors of British Honduras
1861 births
1918 deaths
Colonial Secretaries of the Bahamas
Companions of the Order of St Michael and St George
Accidental deaths in Belize